Nordic Landscape with a Castle on a Hill is a circa 1660 oil painting by the Dutch Golden Age painter  Allaert van Everdingen. It is on display in the Musée des Beaux-Arts of Strasbourg, France. Its inventory number is 560.

Its previous history is not known.

Van Everdingen had travelled to Norway and Sweden in 1644, and several of his subsequent landscape paintings, such as the Strasbourg one, are inspired by motives such as hills and mountains, torrents and lakes, forests and skies, as he had seen them there. Only the castle on the hill is not Scandinavian. The Strasbourg painting does not depict a specific place but aggregates different naturalistic elements into a coherent and intimidating whole. This kind of landscape painting was much admired and emulated by the German Nordic school of the early 19th century, most notably by Caspar David Friedrich and Johan Christian Dahl. Nordic Landscape with a Castle on a Hill incidentally includes the depiction of two busy draughtsmen at the lower right, as a probable reminiscence of Van Everdingen's own Northern journey.

References

External links 
Paysage nordique avec un château sur une colline , presentation on the museum's website
Une visite, un thème - Peinture du XVIIème siècle - 5 genres, p. 1. Different presentation on the museum's website.

Paintings in the collection of the Musée des Beaux-Arts de Strasbourg
Dutch Golden Age paintings
Landscape paintings
1660s paintings
Oil on canvas paintings